Sealed with a Kiss (Chinese: 千山暮雪) is a 2011 Chinese television series based on the novel Qian Shan Mu Xue written by Fei Wo Si Cun; starring Hawick Lau and Ying Er.

The series was popular and developed a cult following online. Hawick Lau, who portrayed the male lead, was likened to the Asian version of Christian Grey.

Synopsis
Orphaned as a child, Tong Xue lives under the care of her maternal uncle. While she was working at a cafe, she caught the attention of Mo Shaoqian, chairman of Yunzhong Corporation. Little does she know that her father once betrayed Yunzhong Corporation and indirectly caused the death of Mo Shaoqian's father. The company was plunged into a serious crisis and Mo was forced to enter into a political marriage with Mu Yongfei, heiress to Mu corporation in order to save his company. On their wedding night, Shaoqian was repulsed by Yongfei's possessive and condescending behaviour and refused to live with her. Shaoqian continuously sought to divorce Yongfei for the next ten years, but she resolutely refused despite both living separately and in a loveless marriage. As Shaoqian discovers Tong Xue's identity, he uses criminal evidence against Tong Xue's uncle to blackmail her into living with him as his mistress. As Shaoqian gets to know Tong Xue, he begins to harbor conflicted feelings for her. On the surface, he treats Tong Xue coldly and toys with her emotions. Secretly, Shaoqian cannot help himself falling for Tong Xue and wanting to protect her. However, Tong Xue is not able to let go of her childhood sweetheart. She also feared Shaoian, wishing and planning for the day, when she escapes away from his empowering claws. However the moment he finally released her, it was too late for her to run free.

Cast
Hawick Lau as Mo Shaoqian
Ying Er as Tong Xue
Wen Zhenrong as Mu Yongfei (Shaoqian's wife) 
Li Zhinan as Xiao Shan (Tong Xue's first love)
Leanne Liu as Jiang Yun (Shao Qian's mother) 
Chang Chen-kuang as Mu Changhe (Yongfei's father)
Zhao Chulun as Mu Zhenfei (Yongfei's younger brother)
Zhang Ran as Liu Yueying (Tong Xue's best friend)
Wang Jingluan as Lin Zixian (Xiao Shan's admirer) 
Liu Kenan as Zhao Gaoxing (Yueying's boyfriend) 
Zheng Long as Wen Hao (Shaoqian's assistant) 
Yang Zitong as Su Shanshan / Liu Mengying (Zhenfei's girlfriend)
Fang Haolun as Zhang Zhiyuan
Xu Xing as He Jie
Cheng Yong as Liu Liangchun
Zhang Jianhong as Housekeeper Ding
Zhang Gong as Mr. Ma
Chen Liangping as Jiang Wei (Tong Xue's uncle) 
Fu Chuanjie as Mo Yaohua (Shaoqian's father)
Hua Mingwei as Tong Wenbin (Tong Xue's father) 
Jiang Kaili as Jiang Wei (Shaoqian's mother)

Soundtrack

Ratings

Sequel
A 7-episode mini series was subsequently aired via Sohu on 14 January 2012.

References

Chinese romance television series
2011 Chinese television series debuts
Television shows based on works by Fei Wo Si Cun